Tisău is a commune in Buzău County, Muntenia, Romania. It is composed of eleven villages: Bărbuncești, Grăjdana, Haleș, Izvoranu, Izvoru (the commune centre), Leiculești, Pădurenii, Salcia, Strezeni, Tisău, and Valea Sălciilor.

The commune is located in the western part of the county, on the border with Prahova County. It lies in the hilly area south of the Curvature Carpathians, on the banks of the Nișcov River (a right tributary of the Buzău River).

Tisău is traversed by county road DJ100H, which connects it to the east to Vernești (where it ends in national road DN10) and to the southwest to Mizil.

Ciolanu Monastery is located on the territory of the commune.

Natives
Alexandru Drăghici

References

Communes in Buzău County
Localities in Muntenia